Irapuram  is a village in the Ernakulam district of Kerala, India. It is located in the Kunnathunad taluk. It lies 9 km away from Perumbavoor towards Muvattupuzha.

Demographics 

According to the 2011 census of India, Irapuram  has 4770 households. The literacy rate of the village is 86.98%.

References 

Villages in Kunnathunad taluk